Benneth Nwankwo  is a Nigerian documentary photographer and film director. He is from Orumba North Local Government Area, Anambra State, Nigeria.  He is also known for directing high school web miniseries, Like Filtered Water, and 2022 Nigerian Dance Drama TV Series, Breakout. On 10 September 2022, Benneth, was announced as the winner of Outstanding Movie Maker Award, in the 2022 Edition of Anambra Media And Entertainment Award.

Career 
Nwankwo has directed a number of contemporary films, including Like Filtered Water (2021), Abuse Of Rights (2021), This Is My Story (2020) and Dreams and Survival (2020). In April 2021, he was told that he would be directing the feature film A Place Between Colours.

On the tenth of September 2022, Benneth Nwankwo, was announced as the winner of Outstanding Movie Maker Award in the 2022 Anambra Media And Entertainment Award. He was nominated alongside film makers; Anthony Alex Rapulu Oramali, Nancy Uche and Jamie Godsword.

As a documentary photographer and a talk show host, on 31 January 2020 he hosted what was considered the first indigenous photo exhibition in Anambra state. The event tagged "Akaraka: Anambra Through A Lens", attracted art and entertainment lovers from South East Nigeria and beyond. The event, which also featured live performances, was intended in part to highlight the state's potential as a tourist economy, in hopes of creating economic opportunity and reducing crime. In addition to Nwankwo, the other photographers exhibited were Uju Egwin, Obiora Okoye, and Michael Ike. The former Commissioner for Youth and Creative Economy in Anambra State, Afam Mbanefo, praised Benneth Nwankwo's usage of documentary photographs to tell the stories of Anambra state.

In October 2017, Benneth Nwankwo published his photographs of a nine-year-old boy hawking groundnut in Anambra state. The photographs quickly circulated all over the internet and were published by various newspapers in Nigeria. Many Nigerians, including 2017 Anambra State Gubernatorial Candidate, Okeke Chika Jerry, expressed interest in assisting the boy, Sunday Nweke, in furthering his education.

Endorsement 
In October 2020, a Nigerian real estate company, De-GraceLand Home Consults, signed Benneth Nwankwo alongside Chioma Okonkwo (Former Miss Impact Anambra) as brand ambassadors. The contract lasted for a year.

Book 

 How To Write About Nigeria : A Collection of Satirical Commentaries That Attempts To Shed Light On The Nigerian Condition.

Filmography 

Dreamscape And Survival (2020)
 The Irreplaceable (2020)
 The Little Things That Matters (2020)
 This Is My Story (2020)
 Abuse Of Rights (2020)
 Hustler (2021) 
 The Web (2020)
 Like Filtered Water - The Series (2021)
 A Place Between Colours (2021)

References

External links 

 Benneth Nwankwo on IMDb

 

1995 births
People from Anambra State
Nigerian photographers
Nigerian film directors
Nigerian television people
Living people
Nigerian documentary filmmakers
Nigerian screenwriters
Nigerian cinematographers
Nigerian television personalities
Nigerian media personalities